Wirrigai is a rural locality of Warren Shire 31°39′54″S 147°56′04″E a few miles north of Warren, New South Wales Driel is also a civil Parish of Ewenmar County, a cadastral division of New South Wales.

Wirrigai is on the Macquarie River and the economy is based in broad acre agriculture.

References

Localities in New South Wales
Geography of New South Wales
Central West (New South Wales)